Benoît Farjat, a French engraver, was born at Lyons in 1646. He was taught the elements of the art by Guillaume Chasteau, whose manner he at first adopted; but he afterwards went to Rome, and acquired a greater command of the graver, and a better style of design, though he is not always correct. He died in Rome in 1724. There are by him some portraits, and various subjects from the Italian masters; the following are the most esteemed:

Portraits
Cardinal Federigo Coccia; after L. David.
Cardinal Cornaro; after the same. 1697.
Cardinal Tommaso Ferrari; after the same. 1695.

Subjects after various masters
The Holy Family, with St. John; after Albani.
The Holy Family, with St. John presenting a Cross; after Pietro da Cortona.
The Marriage, or, according to others, the Coronation, of St. Catharine; after Agostino Carracci.
The Virgin and Infant Jesns, with St. John presenting some fruit; after Annibale Carracci.
The Temptation of St. Anthony; after the same.
The Communion of St. Jerome; after Domenichino.
The Death of St. Francis Xavier; after G. B. Gaulli.
The Marriage of the Virgin; after C. Maratti.
The Nativity of Christ; after the same.
The Race of Atalanta; after P. Locatelli.

Footnotes

References

 

1646 births
1724 deaths
17th-century engravers
18th-century engravers
Engravers from Lyon